Bagh Bahadur (translation: The Tiger Dancer) is a 1989 Bengali drama film  directed and written by Buddhadev Dasgupta. The film is about a man who paints himself as a tiger and dances in a village in Bengal. The movie conveys a strong message as it illustrates the hardships of rural village life in Bengal.

Cast
Archana as Radha
Pavan Malhotra as  Ghunuram
M.V. Vasudeva Rao as  Sibal
Biplab Chatterjee
Rajeswari Roychowdhury

Awards
1989 - National Film Award for Best Feature Film

External links
 

1989 films
Bengali-language Indian films
1989 crime drama films
Films directed by Buddhadeb Dasgupta
Best Feature Film National Film Award winners
1980s Bengali-language films
Indian drama films